Deflation is a 2001 micro-budget short film, written and directed by Roger Ashton-Griffiths. It stars Del Synnott, features Keira Knightley, who also worked as part of the crew, and Sharman Macdonald, her mother, who co-edited the film.

External links 
 

2001 films
2001 short films
2000s English-language films